Crotylsarin (CRS) is an extremely toxic organophosphate nerve agent of the G-series. Like other nerve agents, CRS irreversibly inhibits the acetylcholinesterase. However, since the inhibited enzyme ages so rapidly, the inhibited enzyme can't be reactivated by cholinesterase reactivators.

See also
Nerve agent
Soman

References

G-series nerve agents
Acetylcholinesterase inhibitors
Methylphosphonofluoridates
Crotyl esters